Vernal Regional Airport  is a mile southeast of Vernal, in Uintah County, Utah. It is owned by the city and county and sees one airline, subsidized by the Essential Air Service program.

Federal Aviation Administration records say the airport had 5,474 passenger boardings (enplanements) in calendar year 2008, 3,805 in 2009 and 4,461 in 2010. The National Plan of Integrated Airport Systems for 2011–2015 categorized it as a non-primary commercial service airport (between 2,500 and 10,000 enplanements per year).

History

The original Frontier Airlines (1950-1986) served Vernal for over 30 years.  In 1950 Frontier Douglas DC-3s flew nonstop to Salt Lake City and Rock Springs and direct to Denver, Billings, Casper, Laramie and Cheyenne.  By 1967 Frontier Convair 580s flew nonstop to Salt Lake City and direct to Denver.  Frontier then flew a Convair 580 Salt Lake City-Vernal-Moab-Grand Junction-Farmington-Gallup-Albuquerque-Silver City-Tucson-Phoenix.  Frontier served Vernal until the early 1980s with Convair 580s nonstop to Salt Lake City and direct to Denver; Frontier left Vernal by 1982. Prior to Frontier's service, a Challenger Airlines 1948 route map depicted Vernal as a proposed destination with service to Salt Lake City.  In 1950, Challenger merged with Arizona Airways and Monarch Airlines to form Frontier Airlines which began service that year to Vernal.

A number of commuter airlines served Vernal.  In 1979 Transwestern Airlines was competing with Frontier on the Salt Lake City route with Piper Aircraft.  Salmon Air flew nonstop to Salt Lake City at one point.  By 1983, Air Link Airlines was operating direct, one stop flights to Denver via Hayden, CO or Rock Springs, WY with Swearingen Metroliners. In 1985, SkyWest Airlines Swearingen Metroliners flew nonstop to Salt Lake City as an independent airline. By 1987, SkyWest was flying Metroliners nonstop to SLC as Western Express via a code share agreement with Western Airlines. In 1989 SkyWest had become a Delta Connection air carrier operating code share service for Delta Air Lines flying nonstop Metroliners to Salt Lake City. Air Midwest, a subsidiary of Mesa Airlines which flew to Vernal as America West Express, commenced nonstop flights to Salt Lake City International Airport on July 2, 2006. In January 2008 Great Lakes Aviation replaced Air Midwest and began flying Beechcraft 1900Ds to Denver and on December 5, 2011, Great Lakes began service to Canyonlands Field in Moab, Utah as an extension of its Denver service. However, Great Lakes Airlines subsequently ended its flights to Denver and ceased all service to Vernal.

Facilities
The airport covers 393 acres (159 ha) at an elevation of 5,280 feet (1,609 m). It has one asphalt runway: 17/35 is 7,000 by 100 feet (2,134 x 30 m).

In 2011 the airport had 8,960 aircraft operations, average 24 per day: 84% general aviation and 16% air taxi. 36 aircraft were then based at the airport: 64% single-engine, 22% ultralight, 11% multi-engine, and 3% helicopter.

Airline and destination

Passenger

United Express service is operated by SkyWest Airlines via a code sharing agreement with United Airlines flying with the Canadair CRJ-200 regional jets.

References

External links
 Aerial image as of July 1997 from USGS The National Map
 

Airports in Utah
Transportation in Uintah County, Utah
Buildings and structures in Uintah County, Utah
Essential Air Service